Events in the year 2013 in Burkina Faso.

Incumbents 

 President: Blaise Compaoré
 Prime Minister: Luc-Adolphe Tiao

Events

May 
May 9 – Burkina Faso foreign minister Djibrill Bassole faints during a press conference with Turkish foreign minister Ahmet Davutoglu.

June 
June 2 – Burkina Faso's national soccer team beats Ghana's, making their way to the finals of the African Cup.

July 
July 16 Protestors hold a sit-in in front of the Ministry of Communication to protest government censorship of journalists working for Radiodiffusion Télévision du Burkina (RTB), a Burkinabé state-run media company.
July 28 – Thousands of protesters marched through Ouagadougou in opposition of long-time President Blaise Compaore's attempt to his rule through the formation of a new Senate.
July 30 – The World Bank approves a $50 million IDA credit to the country to help improve access to electricity.

November 
November 24 – An African Rights Court hears a case from family of murdered Burkinabé journalist, Norbert Zongo, accusing the government of refusing to investigate the murder.

December 
December 20 - Country is admitted to the Forest Carbon Partnership Facility (FCPF), putting in place a strategy to combat deforestation.

Deaths

References 

 
2010s in Burkina Faso
Years of the 21st century in Burkina Faso
Burkina Faso
Burkina Faso